These are the list of Bhojpuri language films that are scheduled to release in 2021.

January–March

October–December

References 

Cinema by culture